The Orange Museum (Museu de la Taronja in Valencia) is located in 10 Major Street in Burriana (Castellón), Spain. The building is an example of Valencian Art Nouveau style.

References

External links

 Orange Museum 
 Orange Museum at 'Spain is Culture' website

Agriculture museums in Spain
Museums in the Valencian Community
Buildings and structures in the Province of Valencia
Plana Baixa